Pedro Ruiz (born 1957) is a Colombian Artist, whose focus on conceptual painting is marked by examining the socio-political context of his native Colombia.

Career and education 
He studied at the École nationale supérieure des Beaux-Arts in Paris, which he attended from 1979 to 1983. After completing his degree, he began exploring painting and printing techniques at Stanley William Hayter's studio, Atelier 17. After spending five years in Paris, he returned to his home in Bogotá. There he began work with the advertising agency McCann, where he became the company's Artistic Director.

Major exhibitions and auctions 
Pedro Ruiz began solo exhibitions as an artist in Bogotá in the late 1980s. He is currently represented by Beatriz Esguerra Art in Bogotá.

 (2012–2018) Latin American Art Sale, Christie's, New York, NY
 2016 – GOLD Spirit and Nature of a Territory, Presented By the Embassy of Colombia and Maddox Gallery, Mayfair, London.
2015 – Anything Goes / "Todo Vale", Beatriz Esguerra Art, Bogota, Colombia
 2009 – GOLD Spirit and Nature of a Territory, Museo de Arte Moderno de Bogota, Colombia
 2007 – Love is in the Air, Museo de Arte Moderno de Bogotá, Colombia
 1999 The Natural Library, Galería Casas-Reigner, Bogota

Honors and awards 
 2014 – Named Friend of UNICEF Bogotá
 2010 – Conferred as Knight of the Order of Arts and Letters (Chevalier dans l’Ordre des Arts et des Lettres) by the French government for his contribution to Colombian art
 2003 – Winner of the Call for Exhibitions at the Santa Fe Gallery Room

References

1957 births
Colombian painters
Colombian male painters
Living people
Modern painters